Covered Wagon, also known as Oregon Trail Immigrants Memorial and Pioneer Family, is an outdoor 1934 white marble sculpture by Leo Friedlander installed outside the Oregon State Capitol in Salem, Oregon, United States.

Description and history
Leo Friedlander's Covered Wagon (1934) is a high relief carving depicting a pioneer family in front of a covered wagon, located outside the Oregon State Capitol's main entrance. The figure group includes a father, mother and young boy, plus a horse. The father faces westward with his proper right hand shielding his eyes from the sun, while the mother is shown kneeling and facing forward. The white marble sculpture, carved from a block made of six smaller pieces, measures approximately  x  x  and rests on a granite base that measures approximately  x  x . On the back is a map illustrating the area covered by the Oregon Trail and depictions of pioneer life. The installation also includes a signed inscription that reads: .

The sculpture was surveyed and considered "treatment needed" by the Smithsonian's "Save Outdoor Sculpture!" program in August 1993, and was administered by the Facilities Division of the Oregon Department of Administrative Services at that time.

See also

 1934 in art
 Stone carving
 Stone sculpture
 The Promised Land (sculpture), Portland, Oregon

References

External links

 Covered Wagon (Pioneer Family) relief at the Oregon State Capitol building in Salem, Oregon, DC Memorials
 Capitol Tour Web Exhibit, Oregon Blue Book
 Covered Wagon, Salem, Oregon, from the series The American Monument (1972), Smithsonian American Art Museum
 Covered Wagon, (sculpture), Waymarking

1934 establishments in Oregon
1934 sculptures
Granite sculptures in Oregon
Horses in art
Marble sculptures in Oregon
Monuments and memorials in Salem, Oregon
Oregon Trail
Outdoor sculptures in Salem, Oregon
Sculptures of men in Oregon
Sculptures of women in Oregon
Statues in Oregon